Yr Atal Genhedlaeth is the debut solo album by Super Furry Animals frontman Gruff Rhys. Entirely in the Welsh language, the title of the album and many of the songs are plays on words and puns that might not be obvious even to a Welsh-speaker:

Yr Atal Genhedlaeth – 'The Stuttering Generation', but 'atalgenhedlu' is Welsh for a contraceptive.
Gwn Mi Wn – 'I Know [that] I Know', could also mean 'a gun I know', a reference to the battle in the song.
Epynt – named after a mountain in Mid Wales, but about money, with the 'E' standing for the Euro, and 'pynt' sounding similar to the Welsh word for Pound.
Rhagluniaeth Ysgafn – 'Light programming', but 'lluniaeth ysgafn' means a light snack.
Pwdin Ŵy 1 & 2 – literally 'egg pudding', means '"egg custard', two love songs.
Y Gwybodusion – 'The Experts'
Caerffosiaeth – literally 'sewage fortress'. 'Caer' is a common part of Welsh place-names (for example, Caergybi), used to indicate that there was originally a castle or fortress in the town/city.
Ambell Waith – 'Sometimes'.
Ni Yw Y Byd – 'We Are The World'.
Chwarae'n Troi'n Chwerw – 'When Play Turns Bitter', from a Welsh proverb. A Welsh language standard originally written and sung by Caryl Parry-Jones.

Track listing

All songs by Gruff Rhys unless otherwise stated.

"Yr Atal Genhedlaeth" – 0:08
"Gwn Mi Wn" – 2:33
"Epynt" – 1:48
"Rhagluniaeth Ysgafn" – 2:55
"Pwdin Ŵy 1" – 1:42
"Pwdin Ŵy 2" – 3:13
"Y Gwybodusion" – 1:52
"Caerffosiaeth" – 2:58
"Ambell Waith" – 2:22
"Ni Yw Y Byd" – 3:56
"Chwarae'n Troi'n Chwerw" (Caryl Parry Jones) – 6:04

References

Further reading

2005 debut albums
Gruff Rhys albums
Albums produced by Gorwel Owen
Welsh-language albums